Adolf Arnold Louis Palander af Vega (2 October 1842 – 7 August 1920) was a Swedish naval officer, mostly remembered as the captain on Adolf Erik Nordenskiöld's Vega expedition, the first successful attempt to navigate the Northeast Passage.

Early navy career
Louis Palander was born in Karlskrona, Sweden. His father Axel Fredrik Palander was a rear admiral  in the Swedish Navy, and the director of the Royal Navy shipyard in Karlskrona. His mother was Emelie Jacquette Constance du Rées. Louis Palander became a naval cadet  at the early age of 14. In 1864 he graduated from the Royal Swedish Naval Academy at Karlberg Palace as a second lieutenant and participated in expeditions to the Mediterranean, Sierra Leone and Liberia on the corvette Gefle, as well as in a trip to the United States. After several other appointments at sea, Louis Palander participated in Nordenskiöld's expedition to Spitsbergen in 1868, on board the steamer Sofia. The ship's captain was baron Fredrik von Otter. He married Anna Katarina Grischotti the same year.

Thereafter, Palander served on the ship Vanadis on an expedition to the Mediterranean in 1869–1870. He was subsequently promoted to lieutenant and was the ship's captain on the postal steamer Polhem, first during the winter of 1870–1871 between Gotland and main land Sweden, and then during 1871–1872 to secure the postal route across the Øresund in severe winter conditions. He was also the ship's captain on the steamer Polhem during Nordenskiöld's winter expedition to the Spitsbergen islands in 1872–1873, where he significantly contributed to the scientific work. From the base camp at Mosselbay, Palander and nine other men accompanied Nordenskiöld on the unsuccessful attempt to reach the North Pole in May–June 1873. Upon return to Sweden, Palander's request for an honourable discharge from the navy was granted, and he took employment first as a captain on cargo ships en route to England, and later as a captain for a steamer line based in Gothenburg.

Vega Expedition
In 1877 Palander returned to the Royal Navy and offered to become the captain on the expedition to navigate the Northeast Passage. For this purpose, Palander secured the whaling ship Vega, and selected the crew and officers. The ship sailed from Karlshamn on 22 June 1878, and arrived in Tromsø, (Norway) on 17 July where Nordenskiöld boarded the ship. The expedition, which was carried out during 1878–1879, was ultimately successful, and shortly before the end of the voyage, he was promoted to the full rank of captain.

Upon return to Sweden, he was made a noble by King Oscar II under the surname Palander af Vega, and the  Swedish Parliament awarded him an annual pension of 4,000 Swedish crowns. Palander was an accomplished amateur photographer and brought home approximately 60 photographic plates depicting the journey and people encountered during the trip.

Later navy and political career
During 1881–1883, Palander served as an aide-de-camp to the director of the Royal Navy shipyard in Karlskrona, as well as to the  Department of Sea Warfare  during 1886–1889. In 1889 he was promoted to commander and in 1893 he was appointed as chief of the  supply service (intendenturavdelningen) for the Royal Swedish Naval Materiel Administration. In 1896 he was promoted to rear admiral and first aide-de-camp to the king, and subsequently in 1897 appointed as the director of the Royal Navy shipyard in Karlskrona.  
In 1899 he was made the Chief of the Royal Swedish Naval Materiel Administration and in 1900 promoted to full rank of rear admiral.
In 1901 he became a cabinet minister responsible for the Ministry for Naval Affairs. In 1903 he was promoted to vice admiral.

On 2 August 1905 he resigned his post as cabinet minister together with the rest of the government (as a consequence of the political crisis arising from the dissolution of the union between Norway and Sweden) and resumed his post in the Swedish Royal Navy.

Honours
Founder's Medal, 1880
Vega Medal, 1882
Honorary Knight Grand Cross of the Royal Victorian Order (GCVO), 1908

References

Other sources

 Svenskt Biografiskt Handlexikon (SBH), 2nd edition, Albert Bonniers Förlag, Stockholm, 1906.

Swedish explorers
Swedish nobility
1842 births
1920 deaths
Swedish Navy admirals
Swedish Ministers for Defence
People from Karlskrona
Honorary Knights Grand Cross of the Royal Victorian Order
Recipients of the Royal Geographical Society Founder's Medal